The Busan Museum of Art is a museum in Busan, South Korea.

Gallery

External links

 

Museums in Busan
Haeundae District
Art museums and galleries in South Korea